PEN America (formerly PEN American Center), founded in 1922 and headquartered in New York City, is a nonprofit organization that works to defend and celebrate free expression in the United States and worldwide through the advancement of literature and human rights. PEN America is the largest of the more than 100 PEN centers worldwide that together compose PEN International. PEN America has offices in New York City, Los Angeles, and Washington, D.C.

PEN America's advocacy includes work on press freedom and the safety of journalists, campus free speech, online harassment, artistic freedom, and support to regions of the world with challenges to freedom of expression. PEN America also campaigns for individual writers and journalists who have been imprisoned or come under threat for their work and annually presents the PEN/Barbey Freedom to Write Award.

PEN America hosts public programming and events on literature and human rights, including the PEN World Voices Festival of International Literature and the annual PEN America Literary Awards. PEN America also works to amplify underrepresented voices, including emerging authors and writers who are undocumented, incarcerated, or face obstacles in reaching audiences.

As of June 2022, PEN America staff announced their intention to unionize. The Los Angeles Times reported that workers unionized with Unit of Work, a venture capitalist startup to help workers unionize, and that PEN America recognized the union the day after it was announced.

The organization's name was conceived as an acronym: Poets, Essayists, Novelists (later broadened to Poets, Playwrights, Editors, Essayists, Novelists). As membership expanded to include a more diverse range of people involved in literature and freedom of expression, the name ceased to be an acronym in the United States.

History

PEN America was formed on April 19, 1922, in New York City, and included among its initial members writers such as Willa Cather, Eugene O'Neill, Robert Frost, Ellen Glasgow, Edwin Arlington Robinson, and Robert Benchley. Booth Tarkington served as the organization's first president.

PEN America's founding came after the launch of PEN International in 1921 in London by Catherine Amy Dawson-Scott, a British poet, playwright, and peace activist, who enlisted John Galsworthy as PEN International's first president. The intent of PEN International was to foster international literary fellowship among writers that would transcend national and ethnic divides in the wake of World War I. PEN America subscribes to the principles outlined in the PEN International Charter.

Membership
MEMBERS OF PEN pledge themselves to do their utmost to dispel race, class, and national hatreds and to champion the ideal of one humanity living in peace in the world. And since freedom implies voluntary restraint, members also pledge themselves to oppose such evils of a free press as mendacious publication, deliberate falsehood, and distortion of facts for political and personal ends. – from PEN's Founding Charter, New York City, 1922.Full membership in PEN America generally requires being a published writer with at least one work professionally published, or being a translator, agent, editor, or other publishing professional. There is also a "reader" tier of membership open to supporters from the general public, as well as a "student" membership.

Notable members of PEN America past and present include: Chinua Achebe, Chimamanda Ngozi Adichie, Edward Albee, Maya Angelou, Paul Auster, James Baldwin, Saul Bellow, Giannina Braschi, Teju Cole, Don DeLillo, E.L. Doctorow, Roxane Gay, Langston Hughes, Barbara Kingsolver, Norman Mailer, Thomas Mann, Arthur Miller, Marianne Moore, Toni Morrison, Viet Thanh Nguyen, Lynn Nottage, Grace Paley, Philip Roth, Salman Rushdie, Richard Russo, Sam Shepard, Susan Sontag, John Steinbeck, Elizabeth Strout, Anne Tyler, and Colson Whitehead.

PEN Board of Trustees
The PEN America Board of Trustees is composed of writers, artists, and leaders in the fields of publishing, media, technology, law, finance, human rights, and philanthropy.

Jennifer Egan, a recipient of the Pulitzer Prize and the 2018 Carnegie Medal for literary excellence, became president of PEN America in 2018. Egan was succeeded by Ayad Akhtar on December 2, 2020. Other members of the Board of Trustees Executive Committee are: Executive Vice President Markus Dohle, Vice President Masha Gessen, Vice President Tracy Higgins, Treasurer Yvonne Marsh, and Secretary Ayad Akhtar.

Additional trustees are: Marie Arana, Jennifer Finney Boylan, Gabriella De Ferrari, Roxanne Donovan, Lauren Embrey, Nathan Englander, Jeanmarie Fenrich, Tom Healy, Elizabeth Hemmerdinger, Saeed Jones, Zachary Karabell, Sean Kelly, Franklin Leonard, Margaret Munzer Loeb, Erroll McDonald, Dinaw Mengestu, Sevil Miyhandar, Paul Muldoon, Alexandra Munroe, Christian Oberbeck, Michael Pietsch, Marvin S. Putnam, Theresa Rebeck, Laura Baudo Sillerman, Andrew Solomon, Jacob Weisberg, Jamie Wolf, and Hanya Yanagihara.

The Chief Executive Officer of PEN America is Suzanne Nossel.

Literature
PEN America celebrates the written word with a nationwide series of events throughout the year. Many feature prominent authors who appear at festivals and on panel discussions, give lectures, and are featured at PEN America's Authors' Evenings. As a part of its work, PEN America also celebrates emerging writers, recognizing them through PEN America's Literary Awards or bringing them to new audiences at public events. Among them are: Hermione Hoby, Morgan Jerkins, Crystal Hana Kim, Alice Sola Kim, Lisa Ko, Layli Long Soldier, Carmen Maria Machado, Darnell L. Moore, Alexis Okeowo, Helen Oyeyemi, Tommy Pico, Jenny Zhang, and Ibi Zoboi.

PEN World Voices Festival
The PEN World Voices Festival is a week-long series of events in New York City hosted by PEN America each spring. It is the largest international literary festival in the United States, and the only one with a human rights focus. The festival was founded by Salman Rushdie in the aftermath of September 11, 2001, with the aim of broadening channels of dialogue between the United States and the world.

Notable guests have included: Chimamanda Ngozi Adichie, Margaret Atwood, Paul Auster, Samantha Bee, Giannina Braschi, Carrie Brownstein, Ron Chernow, Hillary Rodham Clinton, Teju Cole, E.L. Doctorow, Dave Eggers, Roxane Gay, Masha Gessen, Saeed Jones, Jhumpa Lahiri, Hasan Minaj, Sean Penn, Cecile Richards, Salman Rushdie, Gabourey Sidibe, Patti Smith, Zadie Smith, Andrew Solomon, Pia Tafdrup, Ngugi wa Thiong'o, Colm Toibin, and Colson Whitehead.

PEN America Literary Awards Program

The PEN America Literary Awards annually honor outstanding voices in literature across genres, including fiction, poetry, drama, science and sports writing, essays, biography, and children's literature. PEN America confers more than 20 awards, fellowships, grants, and prizes each year, presenting nearly US$350,000 to writers and translators.

The US$75,000 PEN/Jean Stein Book Award is currently the top award given by PEN America, and among the largest literary prizes in the United States. Among other awards conferred are the US$50,000 PEN/Nabokov Award for Achievement in International Literature, the US$25,000 PEN/Hemingway Award for a Debut Novel, the US$25,000 PEN/Bingham Award for a Debut Short Story Collection, and the US$10,000 PEN/Open Book Award for new books by writers of color.

PEN America Literary Gala and LitFest
The PEN America Literary Gala in New York and LitFest in Los Angeles are annual events celebrating free expression and the literary arts. These events include tributes and calls to action to audiences of authors, screenwriters, producers, executives, philanthropists, actors, and other devotees of the written word. Honorees have included Stephen King, J. K. Rowling, Toni Morrison, and Margaret Atwood. Celebrated writers serve as Literary Hosts for the events.

PEN America Prison Writing Program
Founded in 1971, the PEN Prison Writing Program provides hundreds of inmates across the country with writing resources and audiences for their work. The program sponsors an annual writing contest, publishes a free writing handbook for prisoners, provides one-on-one mentoring to inmates whose writing shows promise, and seeks to bring inmates' work to the public through literary events, readings, and publications. PEN America also provides assistance to other prison writing initiatives around the country and offers a Writing for Justice Fellowship for writers inside and outside of prison seeking to advance the conversation around the challenges of mass incarceration through creative expression.

Support to writers
The PEN Writers' Emergency Fund assists professional writers in acute, emergency financial crisis. PEN America Membership committees focus on the interests of literary professionals in different fields and include the Translation Committee and the Children and Young Adult Book Authors Committee. The Emerging Voices Fellowship, based at PEN America's Los Angeles office, is a literary mentorship that aims to provide new writers who are isolated from the literary establishment with the tools, skills, and knowledge they need to launch a professional writing career. PEN America also has offered workshops that nurture the writing skills of domestic workers, taxi drivers, street vendors, and others wage earners.

Publications
PEN America has several periodic publications. They include the Prison Writing Awards Anthology featuring winning entries from the annual contest for incarcerated authors, PEN America Best Debut Short Stories, a yearly anthology of fiction by the recipients of the PEN/Robert J. Dau Short Story Prize for Emerging Writers, and PEN America: A Journal for Writers and Readers, founded in 2000.

Free Expression
PEN America's Free Expression Programs defend writers and journalists and protect free expression rights in the United States and around the world. This work includes research and reports on topical issues, advocacy internationally and in the United States, and campaigns on policy issues and on behalf of individual writers and journalists under threat.

Writers at Risk
PEN America's work is sustained advocacy on behalf of individual writers and journalists who are being persecuted because of their work. With help from its members and supporters, PEN America carries out campaigns to ensure the freedom, safety, and ability to write and publish without constraint. Advocacy is conducted from PEN America's Washington, D.C., office, as well as through national and international campaigns, events, reports, and delegations. PEN America also focuses on countries and regions where free expression is under particular challenge, including China, Myanmar, Russia, Belarus, Ukraine, and Central Asia.

Press Freedom
PEN America monitors the freedom of the press and safety of journalists in the United States and internationally. The Press Freedom Incentive Fund supports PEN America members and their allies to mobilize their communities around press freedom, with the aim of creating new constituencies to promote and protect a free press and information access as foundations for a healthy democracy. PEN America also focuses on issues of fraudulent news and media literacy, and has produced an in-depth report, "Faking News: Fraudulent News and the Fight for Truth", alongside its "News Consumers Bill of Rights and Responsibilities." A related project examines indicators of trustworthiness that news organizations can use to educate their audiences on the credibility of their news gathering and distribution practices.

Campus Free Speech
PEN America has a focus on issues surrounding free speech at colleges and universities and seeks to raise awareness of the First Amendment and foster constructive dialogue that upholds the free speech rights of all on campus. This work includes the "PEN America Principles on Campus Free Speech" and the report, "And Campus for All: Diversity, Inclusion, and Freedom of Speech at U.S. Universities".

Online Harassment Field Manual
In April 2018, PEN America launched the Online Harassment Field Manual in an effort to aid writers and journalists who must navigate online spaces by providing resources, tools, and tips to help them respond safely and effectively to incidents of online harassment and hateful speech. PEN America also leads workshops to equip writers, journalists, and all those active online with tools and tactics to defend against hateful speech and trolling.

Artists at Risk Connection
The Artists at Risk Connection is an international hub of more than 700 organizations working to protect artistic freedom around the world by improving access to resources for artists at risk, raising awareness of the threats, and enhancing connections among supporters of artistic freedom. This program extends support to artists of all kinds, encompassing writers, cartoonists, visual artists, filmmakers, musicians, and performance artists, as well as other individuals who produce significant creative output.

See also
 PEN International
 PEN Center USA
 PEN Canada
 Sydney PEN
 PEN World Voices
 PEN/Open Book

References

External links
PEN America
PEN Events Audio Archive
PEN Podcasts
PEN International
PEN American Center archives at Princeton University 

American Center, PEN

American writers' organizations
Freedom of expression organizations
Human rights organizations based in the United States
Culture of New York City
Organizations based in New York City
Organizations established in 1922
1922 establishments in New York City
Freedom of speech in the United States